Coppi is a surname. Notable people with the surname include:

Bruno Coppi (born 1935), Italian-American physicist
Célia Coppi (born 1980), Brazilian handball player
Fausto Coppi (1919-1960), Italian cyclist
Hans Coppi (1916-1942), German resistance fighter
Hans Coppi Jr. (born 1942) German historian
Hilde Coppi (née Rake, 1909–1943), German resistance fighter
Jacopo Coppi called "Jacopo del Meglio" ("the Best") (1523–1591), Italian painter
Serse Coppi (1923–1951) Italian cyclist, brother of Fausto

Other
Cima Coppi, title given to the highest peak in the yearly running of the Giro d'Italia

Italian-language surnames